In systematics, an ideotype is a specimen identified as belonging to a specific taxon by the author of that taxon, but collected from somewhere other than the type locality.

The concept of ideotype in plant breeding was introduced by Donald in 1968 to describe the idealized appearance of a plant variety. It literally means 'a form denoting an idea'. According to Donald, ideotype is a biological model which is expected to perform or behave in a particular manner within a defined environment: "a crop ideotype is a plant model, which is expected to yield a greater quantity or quality of grain, oil or other useful product when developed as a cultivar." Donald and Hamblin (1976) proposed the concepts of isolation, competition and crop ideotypes. Market ideotype, climatic ideotype, edaphic ideotype, stress ideotype and disease/pest ideotypes are its other concepts. The term ideotype has the following synonyms: model plant type, ideal model plant type and ideal plan type.

The term is also used in cognitive science and cognitive psychology, where Ronaldo Vigo (2011, 2013, 2014) introduced it to refer to a type of concept metarepresentation that is a compound memory trace consisting of the structural information detected by humans in categorical stimuli.

Notes

Molecular biology
Botanical nomenclature